Calliostoma lepton is a species of sea snail, a marine gastropod mollusc in the family Calliostomatidae.

Description
The height of the shell attains 12 mm.

Distribution
This species occurs in the Pacific Ocean off the Tuamotu Islands.

References

  Vilvens C. (2012) New species and new records of Seguenzioidea and Trochoidea (Gastropoda) from French Polynesia. Novapex 13(1): 1-23.

External links
 To World Register of Marine Species
 

lepton
Gastropods described in 2012